In category theory, a branch of mathematics, a closed category is a special kind of category.

In a locally small category, the external hom (x, y) maps a pair of objects to a set of morphisms. So in the category of sets, this is an object of the category itself. In the same vein, in a closed category, the (object of) morphisms from one object to another can be seen as lying inside the category. This is the internal hom [x, y].

Every closed category has a forgetful functor to the category of sets, which in particular takes the internal hom to the external hom.

Definition 

A closed category can be defined as a category  with a so-called internal Hom functor

 

with left Yoneda arrows

 

 

and a dinatural transformation

 ,

all satisfying certain coherence conditions.

Examples

Cartesian closed categories are closed categories. In particular, any topos is closed. The canonical example is the category of sets.
Compact closed categories are closed categories. The canonical example is the category FdVect with finite-dimensional vector spaces as objects and linear maps as morphisms.
More generally, any monoidal closed category is a closed category. In this case, the object  is the monoidal unit.

References